Penistone railway station serves the town of Penistone, in the Metropolitan Borough of Barnsley, South Yorkshire, England. Services are provided by Northern Trains. The current station, at the junction of the Woodhead Line and Penistone Line, opened in 1874; it replaced a station solely on the Woodhead Line, dating from the line's opening by the Sheffield, Ashton-Under-Lyne and Manchester Railway in 1845.

The station only serves the Penistone Line currently. The line connects Huddersfield with Sheffield, via Barnsley, with an hourly train in each direction. There is a voluntary organisation which supports and promotes community involvement along the line called the Penistone Line Partnership.

Penistone station is the site of the one of the two remaining passing loops on the Barnsley to Huddersfield line, allowing trains coming from Sheffield and Huddersfield to pass each other. However, the sections either side of it are each single trackthat northwards to Clayton West junction and  having been singled in 1969, whilst that to  has been so since reopening in 1983. The loop was formerly controlled from the distinctive elevated ex-GCR Huddersfield Junction signal box south of the station until 1998, when control was transferred to the new Barnsley PSB and the box closed (it has since been demolished). Immediately north of the station, the line crosses the Don valley on an imposing 98 ft (30 m) high stone viaduct of 29 arches (one of four such structures on the route).

History

Woodhead Line

Until 5 January 1970, Penistone station also served passenger trains on the electrified Woodhead Line from Sheffield Victoria to Manchester Piccadilly. Electric trains started in 1954; previously the service was steam-operated.

The line was closed west of Penistone to Hadfield on 18 July 1981; Penistone station was no longer a junction, but the location of the former Woodhead Line platforms is still visible. The electricity supply to the Woodhead Line was controlled from a large building adjacent to Penistone station, which is still standing; it has now been converted for industrial use.

Trains from Huddersfield continued to use the old main line down the Don Valley to Sheffield until May 1983, when they were diverted via Barnsley over the former SYR route. This had been disused for some years, but was refurbished to passenger standards in less than three months once South Yorkshire PTE agreed to continue funding the Penistone end of the route.

Doncaster Line
Prior to 1959, Penistone was also the terminus of local trains from Doncaster via Barnsley and the Dearne Valley. These trains were timed to connect with Sheffield-Manchester trains at Penistone. This route was opened in 1854.

Proposed service to London
In 2009, Alliance Rail proposed to run a 4 trains-per-day service between Huddersfield and London Kings Cross, via Worksop, Sheffield and Penistone, which would have given Penistone a direct train service to London 4 times a day.

Facilities
The station is unstaffed but has a ticket machine on the Huddersfield bound side. The main buildings (in the vee between the old Woodhead track bed and the Huddersfield line) still stand, but these are in private commercial use. Waiting rooms are provided on each platform, along with digital display screens, automated announcements and timetable poster boards to offer train running information. Level access is possible to both platforms (via a ramp from the car park), but the National Rail page for the station states that neither platform is accessible for wheelchair users due to the barrow crossing at the south end of the station (which links the platforms) having gaps in its surface.

Services

On Sundays, these run every two hours each way.

References

Bibliography

Body, G. (1988), PSL Field Guides - Railways of the Eastern Region Volume 2, Patrick Stephens Ltd, Wellingborough,

External links

Railway stations in Barnsley
DfT Category F1 stations
Woodhead Line
Penistone
Former Great Central Railway stations
Former Lancashire and Yorkshire Railway stations
Northern franchise railway stations
Railway stations in Great Britain opened in 1845
Railway stations in Great Britain closed in 1874
Railway stations in Great Britain opened in 1874